De Bort is a surname. Notable people with the surname include:

 Léon Teisserenc de Bort (1855–1913), French meteorologist
 Pierre Edmond Teisserenc de Bort (1814–1892), French writer and politician

Surnames of French origin